is a Japanese slalom canoeist who has competed at the international level since 2006.

Yazawa participed in two Olympic Games. She finished in 20th place in the K1 event at the 2016 Summer Olympics in Rio de Janeiro. She represented the host nation at the 2020 Summer Olympics in Tokyo where she finished 19th in the K1 event after being eliminated in the semifinal.

Her brother Kazuki Yazawa is also an Olympic slalom canoeist.

World Cup individual podiums

1 Asian Canoe Slalom Championship counting for World Cup points

References

External links 

 

1991 births
Living people
Japanese female canoeists
Olympic canoeists of Japan
Canoeists at the 2016 Summer Olympics
Canoeists at the 2020 Summer Olympics
Asian Games medalists in canoeing
Canoeists at the 2014 Asian Games
Canoeists at the 2018 Asian Games
Asian Games gold medalists for Japan
Asian Games bronze medalists for Japan
Medalists at the 2014 Asian Games
Medalists at the 2018 Asian Games
Sportspeople from Nagano Prefecture
People from Iida, Nagano